Sthenaster emmae is a species of deep sea corallivorous (preys on deep-sea corals) sea star. It is the only known species in its genus. This species in particular is found in the tropical Atlantic.

Description 
The Sthenaster emmae has five arms, a triangular outline, actinal intermediate plates, abactinal plates, ranges from 42mm - 45mm wide, and is usually an orange color. On the actual intermediate plates, there are poorly developed teeth. In contrast, on each abactinal plate, there are about 9 to 12 interlocking teeth per valve present.

Habitat 
Sthenaster emmae was first found off the coast of Jacksonville, Florida and  250-501 meters outside of the ocean banks in Savannah, Georgia. At the Savannah Banks, the Sthenaster emmae are found on hard rock substrate, where various sponges, corals, coral rubble, and gorgonians also share that habitat.

References

Further reading
 Mah, Christopher L. "A new Atlantic species of Evoplosoma with taxonomic summary and in situ observations of Atlantic deep-sea corallivorous Goniasteridae (Valvatida; Asteroidea)." Marine Biodiversity Records 8 (2015): e5.

External links 

WOMRS

Evoplosoma
Animals described in 2010